Mant Khas is a census town in Kangra district in the Indian state of Himachal Pradesh.

Demographics
 India census, Mant Khas had a population of 5240. Males constitute 51% of the population and females 49%. Mant Khas has an average literacy rate of 86%, higher than the national average of 59.5%: male literacy is 88%, and female literacy is 84%. In Mant Khas, 7% of the population is under 6 years of age.

References

Cities and towns in Kangra district